Iran and Yemen have had cordial, if tepid, relations since the Iranian Revolution in 1979. Ties between the Saudi-backed Yemeni government in Aden, however, have been damaged in recent years by Iran's support for the rival Yemeni government in Sanaa linked to the Houthi movement. Since 2019, Iran has recognized the Supreme Political Council as the sole legitimate government of Yemen.

The United States and the Saudi-backed government in Yemen have repeatedly accused Iran of providing funding and weapons to the Zaydi Shia Houthi rebels and on one occasion claimed to have discovered Iranian-made arms in rebel weapons caches. The U.S. and Saudi Arabia also accused Iran's allies in Lebanon and Syria of also supporting the Yemeni government in Sanaa. Iran has also deployed submarines and warships off Yemen's coast, in the Gulf of Aden and Red Sea, ostensibly to conduct anti-piracy operations.

History

Medieval and Early modern era 
According to Muqaddasi, Persians formed the majority of Aden's population in the 10th century.

Persian ports and Yemeni ports like Aden were rival destinations for Indian Ocean commerce. In the mid-12th century, a force from Salghurid Persia besieged Aden.

The Shia Zaidi state of Yemen established diplomatic relations with the Safavid dynasty of Persia.

Pahlavi government 
In the 1960s, Iranian Shah Mohammad Reza Pahlavi supported Yemeni fighters against militant Marxists.

After the Iranian revolution 
In the late 1980s, the Islamic Republic of Iran moved more closely to Yemen following the end of the Iran–Iraq War. In the early 1990s, Iran accommodated Houthi religious students. Among those students was Hussein Badreddin al-Houthi, who led the Houthi insurgency in Yemen against the government. Following the departure of Yemeni President Ali Abdullah Saleh in 2012, Iranian officials began to rhetorically support the Houthis.

In January 2013, a Yemeni boarding team operating from the USS Farragut (DDG-99) seized an Iranian dhow off the coast of Yemen that was found to be carrying Chinese QW-1 MANPADs. Relations between the two nations soured as Iran denied Yemeni assertions that the shipment was an Iranian attempt to arm rebel forces. The ship's movements had been tracked by American forces from the point when it loaded cargo at an Iranian military base until it was seized.

On 2 October 2015, the Yemeni government Aden television reportedly announced that Yemen had severed diplomatic relations with Iran due to alleged Iranian support of Houthis to overthrow Yemeni President Abd Rabbuh Mansur Hadi. A Yemeni government spokesman later denied the television report, saying that "the cabinet has not discussed until now the matter of severing diplomatic relations with Iran and no decision was taken".

In late 2019, the Yemeni embassy in Tehran was transferred to the Houthi government. This move was criticized by the Arab League.

On 17 October 2020, Iran posted Hassan Eyrlou as its ambassador in Sanaa. On 17 December 2021, Eyrlou was evacuated to Tehran after testing positive for COVID-19 and died there three days later.

See also
 Iran–Saudi Arabia relations
 Iran–Libya relations

References

 
Yemen
Bilateral relations of Yemen